Ronan the Accuser is a fictional character appearing in American comic books published by Marvel Comics. Ronan was created by writer Stan Lee and artist Jack Kirby and he first appeared in Fantastic Four #65 (August 1967). He is the Supreme Accuser of the Kree Empire, the militaristic government of the fictional alien race known as the Kree, and is commonly depicted as an adversary of superhero teams such as the Fantastic Four, the Avengers, and the Guardians of the Galaxy. In later years, the character was depicted as a more noble and heroic figure as a member of various superhero groups such as the Starforce, United Front and Annihilators. He was married to the Inhuman Crystal, a princess of the Inhuman Royal Family.

The character has been substantially adapted from the comics into various media, including several animated television series and video games. Lee Pace portrayed the character in the Marvel Cinematic Universe (MCU) films Guardians of the Galaxy (2014) and Captain Marvel (2019).

Publication history
Ronan was created by writer Stan Lee and artist Jack Kirby. He first appeared in Fantastic Four #65 (August 1967).

The character returned sporadically in Captain Marvel, and played an important role in the Kree-Skrull War storyline in The Avengers #88–97. After appearances in Ms. Marvel #19 and Silver Surfer vol. 3, Ronan returned in the Galactic Storm crossover in 1992.

Ronan subsequently appeared in Fantastic Four vol. 3 #13–14 and Iron Man vol. 3 #14, before having a major role in the Maximum Security crossover in Jan 2001.

During the 2006 Annihilation storyline, Ronan received a four-issue eponymous miniseries written by Simon Furman, and a leading role in Annihilation #1–6. He appeared in the sequels, Annihilation: Conquest #1–6 and Annihilation Conquest: Wraith #1–4 in 2007.

After being seen during the Secret Invasion: War of Kings one-shot, the character was used in War of Kings #1–6 (2009) and Realm of Kings: Inhumans #1–4.  Following appearances in The Thanos Imperative #1–6 (2010), Ronan joined the titular team in Annihilators #1–4 (2011) and Annihilators: Earthfall #1–4 (Sept 2011–Dec 2011).

Ronan is seen killed in Death of the Inhumans #3.

Fictional character biography
Ronan was born on the planet Hala, the capital of the Kree Empire in the Greater Magellanic Cloud. Ronan later joined the Accuser Corps, who are the Kree equivalent of military governors and jurists, and his rise through their ranks was extraordinary; he eventually became the third-most powerful being in the Kree Empire. The Supreme Intelligence ultimately appointed him "Supreme Accuser of the Kree Empire". He is known simply as "Ronan the Accuser".

On his first mission, Ronan is sent to Earth to investigate the destruction of a robotic Kree Sentry at the hands of the Fantastic Four. The team defeats Ronan, which prompts a Kree expedition to spy on and assess Earth. Captain Mar-Vell is a member of the team, and he interacts with Ronan frequently during his mission.

Ronan secretly plans with Zarek to overthrow the Kree leader, the Supreme Intelligence, believing the Empire should not be ruled by a non-humanoid entity. But Ronan is paralyzed by the psionic powers of Rick Jones, and control of the Kree Empire reverts to the Supreme Intelligence.

Ronan is subsequently mentally dominated by the Supreme Intelligence, and battles Mar-Vell on multiple occasions. Ronan later regains his sanity and returns to his former position as Supreme Accuser. During the second Kree-Skrull war, Ronan executes a Skrull duplicate of the Silver Surfer.

During the Kree-Shi'ar War, Ronan joins Starforce.

When Earth becomes a prison planet, Ronan serves as its warden. The Supreme Intelligence then plans to subvert the galactic council and use Ego the Living Planet as a weapon. Although Ronan is able to elevate his power by tapping into Ego's own energy, Mister Fantastic, Iron Man, Giant-Man and Bruce Banner manage to create a machine that transfers Ego's essence into Quasar. The weakened Ronan is defeated and captured by the U.S. Agent.

When Ronan is falsely accused of treason by Tana Nile, he discovers he has been framed by a highly placed member of a Kree house. After defending the Kree Empire against the Annihilation Wave, Ronan clears his name and kills his betrayer, although not before he lobotomizes the Supreme Intelligence. In an act of mercy, Ronan kills the Supreme Intelligence and becomes ruler of the Kree Empire.

During the Phalanx conquest of the Kree, Ronan works with the Super-Skrull and Wraith to free his people.

When the Inhumans seek aid from the Kree against the Skrull's Secret Invasion, Ronan agrees on the condition that the Inhuman princess, Crystal, marries him. On their wedding day, Ronan is severely beaten by the Shi'ar Imperial Guard and hospitalized. He does not fully recover until after the War of Kings is over.

During the war with the cancerverse, Ronan is a member of Nova's main attack force. In an effort to prevent further conflict, Ronan joins the Annihilators, who protect Galador from the Dire Wraiths and oppose the Universal Church of Truth's attempt to revive the Magus.

Ronan is soon separated from his wife under the orders of Black Bolt, as part of a truce made between Black Bolt and the Supreme Intelligence to ensure peace between Inhumans and the Kree Empire. Crystal and Ronan are deeply saddened by this decision, as their arranged marriage had eventually become a stronger relationship.

In the Infinity storyline, Ronan the Accuser and the Supreme Intelligence appeared as members of the Galactic Council. Ronan later fights Thanos' minion Black Dwarf of the Black Order, and kills him.

Ronan the Accuser steals The Black Vortex from the cosmically powered X-Men, and, against the Supreme Intelligence's orders, submits to the Vortex and receives cosmic powers. Mister Knife later steals the Vortex and destroys Hala and the Supreme Intelligence. Ronan and the imperial fleet survive, but the last remaining seed of the Supreme Intelligence was stolen from the Collector by Star-Lord's half-sister Victoria.

Ronan wanders the ruins of Hala alone while remembering the names of the Kree that fell in battle when he came into conflict with Noh-Varr and the Inhumans except for Crystal. Thanks to Crystal's reasoning, Ronan blames himself for disobeying the Supreme Intelligence's orders. After freeing his captive, Ronan witnesses Noh-Varr planting the seed of his reality's Plex Intelligence into the remains of the Supreme Intelligence. Even though Hala has a new leader, Ronan still blames himself for what happened to the planet.

In the pages of "Death of the Inhumans," Karnak confronts the unnamed Kree commander of a Kree contingency that was sent away to explore and chart the outer reaches of the Universe. After generations away they finally returned to Hala, only to find it in ruins. The Kree commander also reveals that they eliminated Ronan, exile those loyal to him and decided use the Inhumans as part of their plans to rebuild Hala and bring a new dawn to the Kree Empire. However, Black Bolt eventually found out that the Kree commander had lied to Karnak about Ronan's fate. The Kree actually captured him and the Kree soldiers loyal to him and made gruesome experiments on them. Now merely a cyborg, Ronan begged Black Bolt to end his misery as he apologized for all the pain he caused to the Inhumans to which he complies by whispering "You are forgiven."

Powers and abilities
As a Kree warrior in peak physical condition, Ronan possesses his species' unique physiology and is thus resistant to poisons, toxins, and diseases. He has superhuman physical attributes which are all further enhanced by his exoskeleton body-armor. Ronan's armor, which contains multiple scanners, can also create fields of invisibility, and his gauntlets can discharge cosmic energy bolts or generate sufficient coldness to place certain lifeforms into a state of suspended animation. In addition, Ronan possesses a brilliant strategic mind; his high intellect allowed him to rise to one of the highest positions in the Kree Empire. He also has extensive knowledge in all matters pertaining to Kree law and is well-versed in the use of his species' highly advanced technology.

Ronan's primary weapon is a warhammer-like Accuser Cosmi-Rod called the "Universal Weapon". At its wielder's will, the device can absorb and fire cosmic energy, manipulate matter, generate force-fields, control gravity, and create "time-motion displacement fields". It also allows for interstellar teleportation, hyperspatial passages and flight. As a highly trained Kree soldier, Ronan is extremely proficient in the use of this weapon in both close- and long-ranged confrontations. Even without his war hammer, Ronan has proven a formidable hand-to-hand combatant.

Other versions

Ultimate Marvel
The Ultimate version of Ronan the Accuser is the son of Thanos, and is a part of his empire. He is ultimately defeated by the Thing.

In the series Hunger, another version of Ronan called Ro-Nan is married to Esa-La and have a son named Dra-ta. He leads an army of Kree warriors in a battle against the Chitauri, when both alien races encounter the entity Gah Lak Tus during battle. Ro-Nan is killed in Hunger #3.

JLA/Avengers

Ronan appears as part of Krona's army in JLA/Avengers, and is defeated by DC's Captain Marvel.

In other media

Television
 Ronan the Accuser makes a cameo appearance in the Silver Surfer episode "Radical Justice". This version is a member of the Wanderers, a group consisting of various alien races displaced by Galactus.
 Ronan the Accuser appears in Fantastic Four: World's Greatest Heroes, voiced by Michael Dobson.
 Ronan the Accuser appears in The Super Hero Squad Show episode "Alienating with the Surfer!", voiced by Michael Dorn.
 Ronan the Accuser appears in The Avengers: Earth's Mightiest Heroes, voiced by Keith Szarabajka.
 Ronan the Accuser appears in Hulk and the Agents of S.M.A.S.H., voiced by James C. Mathis III.
 Ronan the Accuser appears in Guardians of the Galaxy (2015), voiced by Jonathan Adams. Prior to the series, this version was exiled from the Kree Empire and became Thanos's top general before Ronan betrayed him and was killed in battle against the Guardians of the Galaxy; creating a power vacuum within Thanos's remaining forces to fill his position. In the present, Nebula uses Ronan's Universal Weapon, an alien seed, and the life-giving energies of the living moon Mandala to resurrect Ronan.
 Ronan the Accuser appears in Lego Marvel Super Heroes - Guardians of the Galaxy: The Thanos Threat, voiced again by Jonathan Adams.
 Ronan the Accuser appears in Marvel Disk Wars: The Avengers, voiced by Hiroshi Shirokuma in the Japanese version and James C. Mathis III in the English version.

Film
Lee Pace portrays Ronan the Accuser in films set in the Marvel Cinematic Universe.
 Ronan first appears in Guardians of the Galaxy (2014). Depicted as an avid and ruthless Kree fanatic whose family was killed in the Kree-Nova War, this version refuses to heed his Empire's peace treaty with the Nova Corps of Xandar and embarks on a genocidal campaign against all Xandarians. Ronan agrees to recover an orb for Thanos in exchange for the latter's help in destroying Xandar, only to renege on their deal upon learning that the orb contains the Power Stone, which he can use to annihilate Xandar himself. Ronan decimates the Nova Corps' fleet, but the Guardians of the Galaxy take the Stone back and use it to destroy him.
 A young Ronan appears in Captain Marvel (2019). He leads the Kree and works alongside the Starforce in hunting Skrulls across the universe. When a group of Skrulls land on Earth, Starforce commander Yon-Rogg contacts Ronan to eradicate them, but the latter is forced to retreat after his fleet is attacked and largely obliterated by Carol Danvers / Captain Marvel. Before he escapes, an impressed Ronan vows to come back for her.

Video games
 Ronan the Accuser appears in Avengers in Galactic Storm. 
 Ronan the Accuser appears as an unlockable character in Lego Marvel Super Heroes.
 Ronan the Accuser appears as an unlockable character in Lego Marvel's Avengers, voiced by John DiMaggio.
 Ronan the Accuser appears in Lego Marvel Super Heroes 2.
 Ronan the Accuser appears as a non-playable, later unlockable, character, in Marvel: Avengers Alliance.
 Ronan the Accuser appears as an unlockable character in Marvel: Avengers Alliance Tactics.
 Ronan the Accuser, based on the MCU incarnation, appears as a playable character in Disney Infinity 2.0, voiced again by James C. Mathis III.
 Ronan the Accuser appears as a playable character in Marvel Contest of Champions.
 Ronan the Accuser, based on the MCU incarnation, appears as a playable character in Disney Infinity 3.0, voiced again by James C. Mathis III.
 Ronan the Accuser appears in Marvel Avengers Alliance 2.
 Ronan the Accuser appears as a playable character in Marvel: Future Fight.
 Ronan the Accuser appears in Marvel Powers United VR, voiced again by Jonathan Adams.
 Ronan the Accuser appears as a boss in Marvel Ultimate Alliance 3: The Black Order, voiced again by James C. Mathis III.
 Ronan the Accuser appears in Marvel Dimension of Heroes, voiced again by James C. Mathis III.

Merchandise
 Ronan the Accuser received a figure in the Classic Marvel Figurine Collection line.
 Ronan the Accuser received several figures in the Marvel HeroClix line.
 The MCU incarnation of Ronan the Accuser received a figure in the Guardians of the Galaxy film tie-in toy line.
 The MCU incarnation of Ronan the Accuser received a Funko Pop vinyl figure.
 Two Ronan the Accuser bobble-heads were released as part of Funko's Guardians of the Galaxy Mystery Minis line.
 Ronan the Accuser, based on the MCU incarnation, received a figure as part of the Disney Infinity 2.0 range of figures.
 The MCU incarnation of Ronan the Accuser received a GameStop-exclusive figure in Hasbro's Marvel Legends line via the Marvel Studios: The First Ten Years sub-line.

References

External links
 Ronan the Accuser at the Marvel Universe
 Ronan the Accuser at the Marvel Database Project
 

Characters created by Jack Kirby
Characters created by Stan Lee
Comics characters introduced in 1967
Fictional hammer fighters
Fictional mass murderers
Fictional military strategists
Fictional war veterans
Galactic emperors
Guardians of the Galaxy characters
Kree
Male characters in film
Marvel Comics characters who can move at superhuman speeds
Marvel Comics characters with superhuman strength
Marvel Comics extraterrestrial supervillains
Marvel Comics film characters
Marvel Comics male supervillains
Marvel Comics military personnel
Marvel Comics supervillains
Video game bosses
Villains in animated television series